The following are the national records in athletics in Chad maintained by Chad's national athletics federation: Federation Tchadienne d'Athletisme (FTA).

Outdoor

Key to tables:

h = hand timing

Men

Women

Indoor

Men

Women

References
General
World Athletics Statistic Handbook 2019: National Outdoor Records
World Athletics Statistic Handbook 2018: National Indoor Records
Specific

External links

Chad
Records
Athletics